The 2016–17 Central Michigan Chippewas women's basketball team represented Central Michigan University during the 2016–17 NCAA Division I women's basketball season. The Chippewas, led by tenth year head coach Sue Guevara, played their home games at McGuirk Arena as members of the West Division of the Mid-American Conference. They finished the season 23–9 overall, 15–3 during MAC play to finish in first place, and win the MAC West Division, and MAC regular season championships. As the No. 1 seed in the MAC tournament, they were upset by No. 8 seed Western Michigan in the quarterfinals. They received an automatic bid to the 2017 Women's National Invitation Tournament, where they lost in the first round at Wright State.

Schedule

|-
!colspan=9 style="background:#660033; color:#FFCC00;"| Non-conference regular season

|-
!colspan=9 style="background:#660033; color:#FFCC00;"| MAC regular season

|-
!colspan=9 style="background:#660033; color:#FFCC00;"| MAC Tournament

|-
!colspan=9 style="background:#660033; color:#FFCC00;"| WNIT

See also
 2016–17 Central Michigan Chippewas men's basketball team

References

Central Michigan
Central Michigan Chippewas women's basketball seasons
2017 Women's National Invitation Tournament participants